Optimism is an attitude reflecting a belief or hope that the outcome of some specific endeavor, or outcomes in general, will be positive, favorable, and desirable. A common idiom used to illustrate optimism versus pessimism is a glass filled with water to the halfway point: an optimist is said to see the glass as half full, while a pessimist sees the glass as half empty.

The term derives from the Latin optimum, meaning "best". Being optimistic, in the typical sense of the word, is defined as expecting the best possible outcome from any given situation. This is usually referred to in psychology as dispositional optimism. It thus reflects a belief that future conditions will work out for the best. For this reason, it is seen as a trait that fosters resilience in the face of stress.

Theories of optimism include dispositional models and models of explanatory style. Methods to measure optimism have been developed within both of these theoretical approaches, such as various forms of the Life Orientation Test for the original dispositional definition of optimism and the Attributional Style Questionnaire designed to test optimism in terms of explanatory style.

Variation in optimism and pessimism is somewhat heritable and reflects biological trait systems to some degree. It is also influenced by environmental factors, including family environment, with some suggesting it can be learned. Optimism may also be linked to health.

Psychological optimism

Dispositional optimism 

Researchers operationalize the term differently depending on their research. As with any trait characteristic, there are several ways to evaluate optimism, such as the Life Orientation Test (LOT), an 8-item scale developed in 1985 by Michael Scheier and Charles Carver.

Dispositional optimism and pessimism are typically assessed by asking people whether they expect future outcomes to be beneficial or negative (see below). The LOT returns separate optimism and pessimism scores for each individual. Behaviourally, these two scores correlate around r = 0.5. Optimistic scores on this scale predict better outcomes in relationships, higher social status, and reduced loss of well-being following adversity. Health-preserving behaviors are associated with optimism while health-damaging behaviors are associated with pessimism.

Some have argued that optimism is the opposite end of a single dimension with pessimism, with any distinction between them reflecting factors such as social desirability.  Confirmatory modelling, however, supports a two-dimensional model and the two dimensions predict different outcomes. Genetic modelling confirms this independence, showing that pessimism and optimism are inherited as independent traits, with the typical correlation between them emerging as a result of a general well-being factor and family environment influences. It is suggested that patients with high dispositional optimism appear to have stronger immune system since it buffers it against psychological stressors. Optimists appear to live longer.

Explanatory style 

Explanatory style is distinct from dispositional theories of optimism. While related to life-orientation measures of optimism, attributional style theory suggests that dispositional optimism and pessimism are reflections of the ways people explain events, i.e., that attributions cause these dispositions. Here, an optimist would view defeat as temporary, does not apply to other cases, and is not considered their fault. Measures of attributional style distinguish three dimensions among explanations for events: Whether these explanations draw on internal versus external causes; whether the causes are viewed as stable versus unstable; and whether explanations apply globally versus being situationally specific. In addition, the measures distinguish attributions for positive and for negative events.

An optimistic person attributes internal, stable, and global explanations to good things. Pessimistic explanations attribute these traits of stability, globality, and internality to negative events, such as difficulty in relationships. Models of Optimistic and Pessimistic attributions show that attributions themselves are a cognitive style – individuals who tend to focus on the global explanations do so for all types of events, and the styles correlate among each other. In addition to this, individuals vary in how optimistic their attributions are for good events, and on how pessimistic their attributions are for bad events, but these two traits of optimism and pessimism are un-correlated.

There is much debate about the relationship between explanatory style and optimism. Some researchers argue that optimism is simply the lay-term for what researchers know as explanatory style. More commonly, it is found that explanatory style is quite distinct from dispositional optimism, and the two should not be used interchangeably as they are marginally correlated at best. More research is required to "bridge" or further differentiate these concepts.

Origins 

As with all psychological traits, differences in both dispositional optimism and pessimism  and in attributional style are heritable. Both optimism and pessimism are strongly influenced by environmental factors, including family environment. It has been suggested that optimism may be indirectly inherited as a reflection of underlying heritable traits such as intelligence, temperament, and alcoholism. There is evidence from twin studies that show, for instance, that the inherited component of the dispositional optimism is about 25 percent, making this trait a stable personality dimension and a predictor of life outcomes. Its genetic origin, which interacts with environmental influences and other risks, also determines the vulnerability to depression across the lifespan. Many theories assume optimism can be learned, and research supports a modest role of family-environment acting to raise (or lower) optimism and lower (or raise) neuroticism and pessimism.

Work utilising brain imaging and biochemistry suggests that at a biological trait level, optimism and pessimism reflect brain systems specialised for the tasks of processing and incorporating beliefs regarding good and bad information respectively.

Assessment

Life Orientation Test 

The Life Orientation Test (LOT) was designed by Scheier and Carver (1985) to assess dispositional optimism – expecting positive or negative outcomes, and is one of the more popular tests of optimism and pessimism. This was also often used in early studies that examine the effects of these dispositions in health-related domains. Scheier and Carver's initial research, which surveyed college students, found that optimistic participants were less likely to show an increase in symptoms like dizziness, muscle soreness, fatigue, blurred vision, and other physical complaints than pessimistic respondents.

There are eight items and four filler items in the test. Four are positive items (e.g. "In uncertain times, I usually expect the best") and four are negative items e.g. "If something can go wrong for me, it will." The LOT has been revised twice—once by the original creators (LOT-R) and also by Chang, Maydeu-Olivares, and D'Zurilla as the Extended Life Orientation Test (ELOT). The Revised Life Orientation Test (LOT-R: Scheier, Carver, & Bridges, 1994) consists of six items, each scored on a 5-point scale from "Strongly disagree" to "Strongly agree" and four filler items. Half of the coded items are phrased in an optimistic way while the other half in a pessimistic way. In comparison with its previous iteration, LOT-R offers good internal consistency overtime although there are item overlaps, making the correlation between the LOT and LOT-R extremely high.

Attributional Style Questionnaire 

This Attributional Style Questionnaire (ASQ: Peterson et al. 1982) is based on the explanatory style model of optimism. Subjects read a list of six positive and negative events (e.g. "you have been looking for a job unsuccessfully for some time"), and are asked to record a possible cause for the event. They then rate whether this is internal or external, stable or changeable, and global or local to the event. There are several modified versions of the ASQ including the Expanded Attributional Style Questionnaire (EASQ), the Content Analysis of Verbatim Explanations (CAVE), and the ASQ designed for testing the optimism of children.

Associations with health 

Optimism and health are correlated moderately. Optimism has been shown to explain between 5–10% of the variation in the likelihood of developing some health conditions (correlation coefficients between .20 and .30), notably including cardiovascular disease, stroke, and depression.

The relationship between optimism and health has also been studied with regard to physical symptoms, coping strategies and negative affect for those suffering from rheumatoid arthritis, asthma, and fibromyalgia.

It has been found that among individuals with these diseases, optimists are not more likely than pessimists to report pain alleviation due to coping strategies, despite differences in psychological well-being between the two groups. A meta-analysis has confirmed the assumption that optimism is related to psychological well-being: "Put simply, optimists emerge from difficult circumstances with less distress than do pessimists." Furthermore, the correlation appears to be attributable to coping style: "That is, optimists seem intent on facing problems head-on, taking active and constructive steps to solve their problems; pessimists are more likely to abandon their effort to attain their goals."

Optimists may respond better to stress: pessimists have shown higher levels of cortisol (the "stress hormone") and trouble regulating cortisol in response to stressors. Another study by Scheier examined the recovery process for a number of patients that had undergone surgery. The study showed that optimism was a strong predictor of the rate of recovery. Optimists achieved faster results in "behavioral milestones" such as sitting in bed, walking around, etc. They also were rated by staff as having a more favorable physical recovery. In a 6-month later follow-up, it was found that optimists were quicker to resume normal activities.

Optimism and well-being 

A number of studies have been done on optimism and psychological well-being. One 30-year study undertaken by Lee et al. (2019) assessed the overall optimism and longevity of cohorts of men from the Veterans Affairs Normative Aging Study and women from the Nurses’ Health Study. The study found a positive correlation between higher levels of optimism and exceptional longevity, which the study defined as a lifespan exceeding 85 years.

Another study conducted by Aspinwall and Taylor (1990) assessed incoming freshmen on a range of personality factors such as optimism, self-esteem, locus of self-control, etc. It was found that freshmen who scored high on optimism before entering college were reported to have lower levels of psychological distress than their more pessimistic peers, while controlling for the other personality factors. Over time, the more optimistic students were less stressed, less lonely, and less depressed than their pessimistic counterparts. Thus, this study suggests a strong link between optimism and psychological well-being.

In addition low optimism may help explain the association between caregivers' anger and reduced sense of vitality.

A recent meta-analysis of optimism supported past findings that optimism is positively correlated with life satisfaction, happiness, psychological and physical well-being and negatively correlated with depression and anxiety.

Seeking to explain the correlation, researchers find that optimists choose healthier lifestyles. For example, optimists smoke less, are more physically active, consume more fruit, vegetables and whole-grain bread, and are more moderate in alcohol consumption.

Translating association into modifiability 

Research to date has demonstrated that optimists are less likely to have certain diseases or develop certain diseases over time. By comparison, research has not yet been able to demonstrate the ability to change an individual's level of optimism through psychological interventions, and thereby alter the course of disease or likelihood for development of disease. Though in that same vein, an article by Mayo Clinic argues steps to change self-talk from negative to positive may shift individuals from a negative to a more positive/optimistic outlook. Strategies claimed to be of value include surrounding oneself with positive people, identifying areas of change, practicing positive self-talk, being open to humor, and following a healthy lifestyle. There is also the notion of "learned optimism" in positive psychology, which holds that joy is a talent that can be cultivated and can be achieved through specific actions such as the challenging negative self talk or overcoming "learned helplessness". However, criticism against positive psychology argues that the field of positive psychology places too much importance on "upbeat thinking, while shunting challenging and difficult experiences to the side."

There are researchers in a study involving twins who found that optimism is largely inherited at birth. Along with the recognition that childhood experiences determine an individual's outlook, such studies demonstrate the genetic basis for optimism reinforces the recognized difficulty in changing or manipulating the direction of an adult's disposition from pessimist to optimist.

Philosophical optimism

One of the earliest forms of philosophical optimism was Socrates' theory of moral intellectualism, which formed part of the thinker's enlightenment model through the process of self-improvement. According to the philosopher, it is possible to live a virtuous life by attaining moral perfection through philosophical self-examination. He maintained that knowledge of moral truth is necessary and sufficient for leading a good life. In his philosophical investigations, Socrates followed a model that did not merely focus on the intellect or reason but a balanced practice that also consider the emotion as an important contributor to the richness of human experience.

Distinct from a disposition to believe that things will work out, there is a philosophical idea that, perhaps in ways that may not be fully comprehended, the present moment is in an optimum state.  This view that all of nature - past, present, and future - operates by laws of optimization along the lines of Hamilton's principle in the realm of physics is countered by views such as idealism, realism, and philosophical pessimism. Philosophers often link the concept of optimism with the name of Gottfried Wilhelm Leibniz, who held that we live in the best of all possible worlds (le meilleur des mondes possibles), or that God created a physical universe that applies the laws of physics. The concept was also reflected in an aspect of Francois-Marie Arouet de Voltaire's early philosophy, one that was based on Isaac Newton's view that described a divinely ordered human condition. This philosophy would also later emerge in Alexander Pope's Essay on Man.

Leibniz proposed that it was not in God's power to create a perfect world, but among possible worlds, he created the best. In one of his writings, he responded to the Blaise Pascal philosophy of awe and desperation in the face of the infinite by claiming that infinity should be celebrated. While Pascal advocated for making man's rational aspirations more humble, Leibniz was optimistic about the capacity of human reason to further extend itself.

This idea was mocked by Voltaire in his satirical novel Candide as baseless optimism of the sort exemplified by the beliefs of one of its characters Dr. Pangloss, which are the opposite of his fellow traveller Martin's pessimism and emphasis on free will.  The optimistic position is also called Panglossianism and became an adjective for excessive, even stupendous, optimism. The phrase "panglossian pessimism" has been used to describe the pessimistic position that, since this is the best of all possible worlds, it is impossible for anything to get any better. Conversely,   philosophical pessimism might be associated with an optimistic long-term view because it implies that no change for the worse is possible. Later, Voltaire found it difficult to reconcile Leibniz' optimism with human suffering as demonstrated by the earthquake that devastated Lisbon in 1755 as well as the atrocities committed by the pre-revolutionary France against its people.

Optimalism

Philosophical optimalism, as defined by Nicholas Rescher, holds that this universe exists because it is better than the alternatives. While this philosophy does not exclude the possibility of a deity, it also does not require one, and is compatible with atheism. Rescher explained that the concept can stand on its own feet, arguing that there is no necessity to seeing optimalism realization as divinely instituted because it is a naturalistic theory in principle.

Psychological optimalism, as defined by the positive psychologist Tal Ben-Shahar, means willingness to accept failure while remaining confident that success will follow, a positive attitude he contrasts with negative perfectionism. Perfectionism can be defined as a persistent compulsive drive toward unattainable goals and valuation based solely in terms of accomplishment. Perfectionists reject the realities and constraints of human ability. They cannot accept failures, delaying any ambitious and productive behavior in fear of failure again. This neuroticism can even lead to clinical depression and low productivity. As an alternative to negative perfectionism, Ben-Shahar suggests the adoption of optimalism. Optimalism allows for failure in pursuit of a goal, and expects that while the trend of activity is towards the positive, it is not necessary to always succeed while striving towards goals. This basis in reality prevents the optimalist from being overwhelmed in the face of failure.

Optimalists accept failures and also learn from them, which encourages further pursuit of achievement. Dr. Tal Ben-Shahar believes that Optimalists and Perfectionists show distinct different motives. Optimalists tend to have more intrinsic, inward desires, with a motivation to learn, while perfectionists are highly motivated by a need to consistently prove themselves worthy.

Optimalism has also been classified into two: product optimalism and process optimalism. The former is described as an outlook that looks to provide the realization of the best possible result while the latter looks for a maximization of the chances of achieving the best possible result. Others classify it either as full-scale, one that implies determinism, or weak determinism, which claims that we have the best laws and initial conditions. Some sources also distinguish the concept from optimism since it does not focus on how things are going well but on how things are going as well as possible.

See also

Affirmations (New Age)
Agathism
Explanatory style (attributional style)
Mood (psychology)
Moral idealism
New Thought
Optimism bias
Pessimism
Philosophy
Philosophy of happiness
Positive mental attitude
Positive psychology
Pronoia (psychology)
Self-efficacy
Silver lining (idiom)

References

 Mayo Clinic Staff. "Positive thinking: Stop negative self-talk to reduce stress". Mayoclinic.org. Mayo Clinic, 4 March 2014. Web. 31 March 2014.

Further reading

Chang, E. (2001). Optimism & Pessimism: Implications for Theory, Research, and Practice, Washington, DC: American Psychological Association. .
Huesemann, Michael H., and Joyce A. Huesemann (2011). Technofix: Why Technology Won't Save Us or the Environment, Chapter 7, "Technological Optimism and Belief in Progress", New Society Publishers, Gabriola Island, British Columbia, Canada, 464 pp.
Seligman, M.E.P., (2006). Learned Optimism: How to Change Your Mind and Your Life, Vintage, .
Sharot, Tali (2012). The Optimism Bias: A Tour of the Irrationally Positive Brain, Vintage, .

External links

 "Being Optimistic"—Optimism as character strength
 
 "Tali Sharot: The optimism bias", Tali Sharot's talk at the TED.com

Literary terminology
New Thought beliefs
Motivation
Personality
Philosophical theories
Philosophy of life